Stigmochora is a genus of fungi in the family Phyllachoraceae.

Distribution
It is has been found in South America and Africa.

Species
As accepted by Species Fungorum;

Stigmochora albiziae 
Stigmochora chloroxyli 
Stigmochora controversa 
Stigmochora deightonii 
Stigmochora natalensis 
Stigmochora parkiae 
Stigmochora simaroubae 
Stigmochora ulei 
Stigmochora variegata 

Former species;
 S. confertissima  = Venturia geranii, Venturiaceae
 S. leucothoes  = Pseudomassaria leucothoes, Pseudomassariaceae
 S. tetraspora  = Endodothella tetraspora, Phyllachoraceae

References

External links
Index Fungorum

Phyllachorales
Sordariomycetes genera